Here are the Black Reel nominees and winners for the Best Actor TV Movie category. The category returned in 2012. 

Multiple Nominations 
 Ving Rhames  - 4 nominations
 Roger Guenveur Smith, Andre Braugher, Danny Glover, Delroy Lindo, Idris Elba - 2 nominations

Winners/Nominees

References

Black Reel Awards